Rockschool is a television series aired by the BBC and PBS on 1 November 1983. The series explored the history of rock music and gave instruction in popular performance techniques.

Aired in the United States by public television station WNET, Herbie Hancock was brought in to host the series for the American market. Hancock presented various topics in a studio classroom setting, interspersed with short lessons from the "Rockschool Band" composed of Deirdre Cartwright on electric guitar, Geoff Nicholls on drums, and Henry Thomas on bass, and interview segments with well-known musicians.

The series was produced by the Educational Broadcasting Corporation and distributed in the U.S. by Lorimar Productions in 1987, as six volumes on VHS tape.

Volume listing
 Rockschool Volume 1: Elementary Equipment and Basic Technique
 Rockschool Volume 2: Blues to Heavy Metal
 Rockschool Volume 3: Funk, Reggae & New Music
 Rockschool Volume 4: Digital Age Hardware
 Rockschool Volume 5: Melody and Soloing – The Lifeblood of Rock
 Rockschool Volume 6: Arrangements – Putting It All Together

Companion books
Two volumes titled Rockschool 1: Guitar, Bass & Drums and Rockschool 2: Electronics, Keyboards & Vocals were published in the U.S. in 1987 by Fireside Books (Simon & Schuster). Volume 1 was previously published in Great Britain by the BBC in 1984. The books were edited by series producer Chris Lent.

Credits
Host: Herbie Hancock (U.S. series)
The Rockschool Band
 Guitar: Deirdre Cartwright
 Bass guitar: Henry Thomas
 Drums: Geoff Nicholls
 Keyboards: Alastair Gavin (Series 2)

Produced and directed by: Chris Lent

Guest demonstrators
 Tony Banks
 Graham Bonnet
 Bill Bruford
 Vince Clarke
 The Communards
 John Entwistle
 Omar Hakim
 Jan Hammer
 Allan Holdsworth
 James Ingram
 Danny Johnson
 Gary Moore
 Carl Palmer
 Ian Paice
 Midge Ure
 Dennis Bovell
 Wilko Johnson
 Robbie Shakespeare
 Andy Taylor

Performances
 Bronski Beat
 Depeche Mode
 Thomas Dolby
 Japan
 Freddie King
 Annie Lennox
 The Mahavishnu Orchestra
 The Pointer Sisters
 Motörhead
 Jimi Hendrix
 Bootsy Collins
 The Smiths
 U2
 Rick Wakeman

References
 Rockschool on IMDb
 Episode guide

http://www.alastairgavin.com/home-ios.html Alastair Gavin (official site)
 Deirdre Cartwright (official site)
 Sarah Jane Morris – has worked with Alastair Gavin and Henry Thomas

1983 British television series debuts
1987 British television series endings
1980s British music television series
British educational television series
PBS original programming
BBC Television shows
Television series by WNET
English-language television shows